Duster or dusters may refer to:

People
 Alfreda Duster (1904–1983), Chicago-based social worker and civic leader, daughter of civil rights activist Ida B. Wells-Barnett, mother of academician Troy Barnett (below)
 Anthony Duster Bennett (1946–1976), British blues singer and musician
 Troy Duster, American sociologist, grandson of grandson Ida B. Wells-Barnett, son of Alfred Duster (above)
 Joseph Dusty Hill (1949–2021), also known as Duster, bassist, keyboardist, and co-vocalist with the American rock group ZZ Top
 John Duster Mails (1894–1974), American Major League Baseball pitcher

Arts and entertainment
 Duster (Gary Burton album), 1967
 Duster (Duster album), 2019
 Duster (band), an American slowcore band
 The Dusters, a Nashville-based blues rock trio
 Duster (Mother 3), a main character in the game Mother 3

Cleaning implements
 A device used for dusting (housekeeping)
 Feather duster, used for housecleaning
 Gas duster, used to clean electronics

Sports teams
 Amarillo Dusters, original name of the Amarillo Venom indoor football team
 Binghamton Dusters, an ice hockey team in the American Hockey League
 Broome Dusters, a former ice hockey team in the North American Hockey League

Vehicles
 Crop duster, an airplane used for aerial application of pesticides
 Dacia Duster, a Romanian compact sport utility vehicle
 DSK Duster, a glider
 Plymouth Duster, an American automobile

Weapons
 Knuckle dusters, another name for brass knuckles
 M42 Duster, a self-propelled anti-aircraft gun

Other uses
 Duster, Texas, United States, an unincorporated community
 Duster (clothing), a long, loose coat or housecoat
 Hudson Dusters, a New York City street gang in the early twentieth century
 Duster, an informal term for a dust storm.

See also
 Red Duster (disambiguation)